Nicholas Scott Martini (born June 27, 1990) is an American professional baseball outfielder in the Cincinnati Reds organization. He has played in Major League Baseball (MLB) for the Oakland Athletics, San Diego Padres, and Chicago Cubs, and in the KBO League for the NC Dinos.

Career

Amateur
Martini is from Crystal Lake, Illinois, and grew up as a fan of the Chicago Cubs. Nick attended Hannah Beardsley middle school He graduated from Prairie Ridge High School in Crystal Lake in 2008; Martini attended Kansas State University where he played college baseball for the Kansas State Wildcats. In 2010, Martini won the Big 12 Conference's Baseball Player of the Year Award, sharing the honor with Aaron Senne. After the 2010 season, he played collegiate summer baseball with the Falmouth Commodores of the Cape Cod Baseball League. Martini safely reached base in 93 consecutive games during the 2009 through 2011 seasons.

St. Louis Cardinals
The St. Louis Cardinals selected Martini in the seventh round (230th overall) of the 2011 MLB draft.  He made his professional debut with the Low-A Batavia Muckdogs. In 2012, he played for the Single-A Quad Cities River Bandits, slashing .266/.361/.344 with 2 home runs and 52 RBI. The next year, Martini played for the Single-A Peoria Chiefs, batting .252/.339/.329 with 2 home runs and 36 RBI. He split the 2014 season between the High-A Springfield Cardinals and the Double-A Palm Beach Cardinals, posting a .260/.337/.385 batting line to go along with career-highs in home runs (7) and RBI (60). In 2015, Martini played for the Triple-A Memphis Redbirds and Springfield, accumulating a .285/.392/.407 batting line with 6 home runs and 46 RBI. The next season, he again split the year between Memphis and Springfield, slashing .259/.352/.354 with 5 home runs and 39 RBI. He returned to Memphis and Springfield for a third straight split year in 2017, posting a .294/.382/.423 slash line with career-highs in home runs (8) and RBI (70). After playing for seven years in the Cards’ Minor League Baseball (MiLB) system, he was granted free agency on November 6, 2017.

Oakland Athletics
On January 10, 2018, Martini signed a minor league contract with the Oakland Athletics organization. He was assigned to the Triple-A Nashville Sounds to begin the season. On June 6, 2018, Martini was selected to the 40-man roster and promoted to the major leagues for the first time. On June 23, Martini notched his first career hit, which drove in the winning run in a 7-6 victory over the Chicago White Sox. On September 20, he hit his first big league home run off Los Angeles Angels catcher Francisco Arcia, who had been summoned to pitch in mop-up duty in a 21-3 blowout victory by the A's. Martini finished the season with a slash line of .296/.397/.414.

The Athletics optioned Martini to Triple-A Las Vegas before the 2019 season, where he played until he was called up on July 22. He pitched the eighth inning of a July 22 11-1 loss against the Houston Astros, giving up two walks but no runs, and was returned to Las Vegas the next day. On August 25, Martini was designated for assignment after going 1-for-11 in 6 major league games.

San Diego Padres
On August 28, 2019, Martini was claimed off waivers by the San Diego Padres. In 26 games for the Padres, Martini logged a .244/.344/.317 batting line with 5 RBI. He was designated for assignment on November 20, 2019.

Philadelphia Phillies
On November 25, 2019, Martini was claimed off waivers by the Cincinnati Reds. He was designated for assignment by the team on January 8, 2020, following the signing of Shogo Akiyama.

On January 14, 2020, Martini was claimed off waivers by the Philadelphia Phillies. He was designated for assignment on February 15. He was outrighted on February 19 and invited to Spring Training as a non-roster invitee. Martini did not play in a game in 2020 due to the cancellation of the minor league season because of the COVID-19 pandemic. He became a free agent on November 2, 2020.

Chicago Cubs
On January 2, 2021, Martini signed a minor league contract with the Chicago Cubs organization. On May 7, 2021, Martini was selected to the active roster after Ian Happ was placed on the injured list. Martini went for 1-for-12  with 1 RBI in 12 games before being designated for assignment on June 5. Martini was outrighted to the Triple-A Iowa Cubs on June 7. On September 8, Martini was re-selected to the 40-man roster. Martini was re-outrighted to the Triple-A Iowa Cubs on October 3. He elected free agency on November 5, 2021.

NC Dinos
On December 21, 2021, Martini signed with the NC Dinos of the KBO League for $550,000 in salary and signing bonus, with an additional $250k possible from incentives. Martini played in 139 games for the Dinos in 2022, slashing .296/.365/.461 with 16 home runs, 85 RBI, and 12 stolen bases. He became a free agent after the 2022 season.

Cincinnati Reds
On February 3, 2023, Martini signed a minor league contract with the Cincinnati Reds organization.

References

External links

1990 births
Living people
People from Crystal Lake, Illinois
Sportspeople from the Chicago metropolitan area
Baseball players from Illinois
Major League Baseball outfielders
Oakland Athletics players
San Diego Padres players
Chicago Cubs players
Kansas State Wildcats baseball players
Falmouth Commodores players
Batavia Muckdogs players
Quad Cities River Bandits players
Peoria Chiefs players
Palm Beach Cardinals players
Springfield Cardinals players
Memphis Redbirds players
Nashville Sounds players
Las Vegas Aviators players